Ab Garmu or Abgarmu or Ab-e Garmu may refer to:
 Ab Garmu, Bushehr
 Ab Garmu-ye Bala, Fars Province
 Ab-e Garmu, Narmashir, Kerman Province
 Ab-e Garmu, Rudbar-e Jonubi, Kerman Province
 Ab Garmu, Kohgiluyeh and Boyer-Ahmad

See also
 Abgarm (disambiguation)
 Ab Garmeh (disambiguation)